The  was a Japanese succession dispute that occurred in 842, during the early Heian period. Fujiwara no Yoshifusa's nephew, the future Emperor Montoku, took over the role of Crown Prince, while the former crown prince Prince Tsunesada and a number of Yoshifusa's rivals were removed from power. It brought an end to thirty years of uneventful successions that the court had enjoyed by the wishes of Emperor Kanmu and the power of Emperor Saga.

Background 
In 823, Emperor Saga abdicated the throne, and his younger brother ascended as Emperor Junna. In 833, the throne passed again to Saga's son, Emperor Ninmyō. At this point, Prince Tsunesada, a son of Junna by Saga's daughter Princess Seishi, was made crown prince. Saga guided the government for almost thirty years, avoiding succession disputes in that time.

During this time, Fujiwara no Yoshifusa of the Hokke gained the confidence of the retired Emperor Saga and his chief consort Tachibana no Kachiko and quickly rose to prominence. Yoshifusa's younger sister  became a wife of Emperor Ninmyō and bore him a son, Prince Michiyasu, the future Emperor Montoku. Yoshifusa wanted this child put on the throne. Tsunesada and his father Junna, uncomfortable with this development, appealed to Saga to allow Tsunesada to leave his position as crown prince, but were refused each time.

Conspiracy and capture 
In 840, the retired Emperor Junna died. Two years later, in the summer of 842, Saga too became seriously sick. Sensing danger, Crown Prince Tsunesada's attendant  and his friend Tachibana no Hayanari, the provisional governor of Tajima Province, expected an attack on the Crown Prince, and planned to take Tsunesada to the eastern provinces. They consulted with Prince Abo, a son of Emperor Heizei, on the matter. Abo did not want to participate, and secretly reported the plot to Tachibana no Kachiko, who was also Hayanari's cousin. Surprised at the seriousness of the situation, Kachiko further consulted on the matter with the chūnagon Yoshifusa himself. Naturally, Yoshifusa reported this to Emperor Ninmyō.

Within weeks of falling sick, Saga died. Two days later, Ninmyō arrested Kowamine, Hayanari, and those viewed as fellow conspirators, and also placed the capital under strict guard. Tsunesada immediately sent a letter of resignation to the Emperor, but it was refused for the moment on the grounds that he was innocent. Within another week, though, the political situation had changed significantly, and major general Fujiwara no Yoshimi, Yoshifusa's younger brother, surrounded the Crown Prince's throne with the imperial guard. The dainagon Fujiwara no Chikanari, chūnagon Fujiwara no Yoshino, and sangi Funya no Akitsu, who had been in attendance, were captured.

Ninmyō released an imperial decree stating that Kowamine and Hayanari and their associates had been plotting a conspiracy, and that although Tsunesada was innocent of any involvement, he would be disinherited as crown prince in order to take responsibility. Chikanari was exiled from the capital, Yoshino was sent to the Dazaifu, and Akitsu to Izumo Province. Kowamine was exiled to Oki Province, and Hayanari to Izu Province, but the latter died along the way. Many other officials who had been serving Tsunesada in roles associated with Crown Prince's affairs, including Harusumi no Yoshitada, were also punished.

Aftermath 
After the incident, Fujiwara no Yoshifusa was promoted to dainagon, and his nephew Prince Michiyasu was made Crown Prince.

This incident is commonly held to be the first in which the Fujiwara family set out to crush its rivals. Yoshifusa, in addition to achieving his aim of setting Prince Michiyasu up as crown prince, struck a blow to the powerful Tomo and Tachibana families, and additionally destroyed the standing of his Fujiwara rivals Chikanari and Yoshino. Even so, the most important legacy of the incident was to end the chain of sibling inheritance, from older brother to younger, preserved by Saga and Junna based on the dying wishes of Emperor Kanmu. Instead, it set up a direct line of inheritance from Saga to Ninmyō to Montoku.

In the years after the incident, Yoshifusa extended his power even further, continuing his promotion. He was the first non-member of the Imperial Family to hold the position of sesshō, and simultaneously held the powerful office of Daijō-daijin. In this way, he helped to build the foundation for future Fujiwara power.

Individuals punished in connection with the incident

References 

9th century in Japan
842